Sergio Martínez vs. Matthew Macklin, billed as Get Your Irish Up, is a boxing middleweight bout for The Ring world title and universally recognized middleweight championship of the world. The bout was held on March 17, 2012, at the Theater at Madison Square Garden in New York, New York, United States.

The fight was televised live on HBO World Championship Boxing.

Dilemma 

During a press conference in his native Argentina on December 29, Martínez renounced his WBC "Diamond" belt and indicated he might pursue a relationship with Showtime over HBO, as he felt HBO mistreated him.

Martínez was forced to give up his WBC belt for fighting Sergei Dzinziruk in March on HBO, a bout Martínez won by an eighth-round KO. The WBC then elevated Sebastian Zbik to the status of full champion and mandated that Zbik face Julio Cesar Chavez Jr., who dethroned Zbik in June.

Background

Martínez 

Martínez is rated No. 3 in THE RING's pound for pound list and is coming off an 11th-round knockout of Darren Barker in October.

Macklin 

In his last fight in June, Macklin lost a controversial split-decision to RING No. 2-rated middleweight and WBA belt holder Felix Sturm, of Germany.

Sturm recently held on to his crown, yet again, with a split-draw against rated middleweight Martin Murray on Dec. 2.

Result 
Middleweight Championship: Sergio Martínez (c) def. Matthew Macklin by TKO (Corner Stoppage) at 3:00 of Round Eleven

Main card 
Middleweight Championship  Sergio Martínez vs.  Matthew Macklin

Super Middleweight bout   Edwin Rodriguez vs.  Don George

Preliminary card 
Heavyweight Bout   Magomed Abdusalamov vs.  Raphael Zumbano Love

International broadcasting

References

External links 
Sergio Martínez vs. Matthew Macklin Official Fight Card from BoxRec
The Buzz

2012 in boxing
2012 in sports in New York City
2010s in Manhattan
Boxing matches at Madison Square Garden
Boxing on HBO
March 2012 sports events in the United States